Morley Quarry is a   Local Nature Reserve on the southern outskirts of Shepshed in Leicestershire.

The quarries are a Regionally Important Geological Site, with rocks dating to 600 million years ago. The habitat is grassland and heath, with heather and gorse. There is a pond which has breeding toads.

There is access from Morley Lane.

References

Local Nature Reserves in Leicestershire
Shepshed